This is a list of airports in Saint Helena, Ascension and Tristan da Cunha.

List

No airfield has so far been planned on the island of Tristan da Cunha.

See also
 Transport in Saint Helena
 For a list sorted by ICAO code, see List of airports by ICAO code: FHefer
 List of airports in the United Kingdom and the British Crown Dependencies

References

External links

 
 
 
Airports
Saint Helena
Saint Helena